Marogong, officially the Municipality of Marogong,  is a 4th class municipality in the province of Lanao del Sur, Philippines. According to the 2020 census, it has a population of 30,118 people.

History 
The Municipality of Marogong was first created as a barangay on July 5, 1965, as part of the Municipality of Tubaran. 13 years after, this barangay was changed into a municipality by virtue of the signing of Presidential Decree (P.D.) No. 1131 dated May 4, 1977, signed into law by President Ferdinand Edralin Marcos, officially creating Barangay Marogong into a regular Municipality by separating it from the Municipality of Tubaran.

Marogong Municipality was first ran by the appointment of Abdulmadid P. Maruhom, who was succeeded by his children Monara Bae, Amron (Arumpac) and Haroun (Actor), now the incumbent Municipal Mayor.

Marogong therefore is suffering from poverty due to misgoverning. According to a report from the CKF organization, the Internal Revenue Allotment is being corrupted by its local government officials. Their people are hoping for change, and this coming election might be their hope.

Marogong was founded by a Sultan Abdulmadid P. Maruhom in 1954 when he explored the forest and settled in what would later become a small town and finally a regular municipality of Lanao del sur. Maruhom was the first appointed mayor and first elected mayor on January 30, 1980.

Geography

Barangays
Marogong is politically subdivided into 24 barangays.

Climate

Demographics

Economy

References

External links
 Marogong Profile at the DTI Cities and Municipalities Competitive Index
 [ Philippine Standard Geographic Code]
 Philippine Census Information

Municipalities of Lanao del Sur